Katy is an unincorporated community in Vernon County, in the U.S. state of Missouri.

History
A post office called Katy was established in 1894, and remained in operation until 1908. The community took its name from the Katy Railroad.

References

Unincorporated communities in Vernon County, Missouri
Unincorporated communities in Missouri